"Name of Love" is a song by French DJ Jean-Roch with vocals by Cuban-American artists Pitbull  and Nayer. It was released on February 10, 2012 on the label named "John-Roch Records". This song was produced by RedOne.

Music video
The music video was released onto Jean-Roch's official VEVO channel on March 25, 2012. It features Jean-Roch, Pitbull and Nayer on a boat.

The video has received over 700.000 views.

Track listing

 Digital download

"Name of Love" (Original Version) – 3:25

Credits and personnel
Jean-Roch – producer, songwriter, vocals
Armando C. Perez – vocals, songwriter
Nayer - vocals
RedOne - producer
John Mamann - songwriter
Jean Claude Sindre - songwriter
Yohan Simon - songwriter
Teddy Sky - songwriter

Source:

References

2012 singles
2012 songs
Pitbull (rapper) songs
Song recordings produced by RedOne
Songs written by RedOne
Songs written by Geraldo Sandell
Songs written by John Mamann
Songs written by Jean-Claude Sindres
Songs written by Yohanne Simon
Songs written by Bilal Hajji